Snapper Halt railway station was a station on the Lynton and Barnstaple Railway, a narrow gauge line that ran through Exmoor from Barnstaple to Lynton and Lynmouth in North Devon, England. The station served a rural area near the hamlet of Snapper.

History
The hamlet derives its name from the station, which in turn was named after the nearby Inn of the same name.  The "Snapper" Inn had long become a private house by the time the railway arrived, and is now known by the name 'Glendale'. It is widely believed that the Inn and the hamlet derived its name from La Snappe, which was first shown recorded here in 1256 and means boggy land, inferior pasture or winter pasture.

The halt opened in 1903 at the request of the village of Goodleigh, and closed with the line on 29 September 1935. Trains stopped here by request, but never after dark.  From 1923 until closure, the line was operated by the Southern Railway.

After closure, one of the coaches - 6991 - was placed on a short length of track at Snapper halt, and used as a summer house.  It was truncated in the 1950s and was eventually burned in the mid-1960s. Some remains of the metalwork was recovered in February 2011 and is waiting reinstatement on a heritage coach of the same layout.

Another coach - 6993 - was left further along the track. In 1959 this was removed by the newly resurrected Festiniog Railway and has now run more miles as Buffet Car 14 in Wales than it ever did in Devon.

Present day

The station building - a simple concrete shelter - still stands and was fitted with a new tiled roof by EA Volunteers in February 2011, replacing the rusted corrugated iron roof that had been in place for many years. At the same time as the roof was replaced, the platform and trackbed were cleared of undergrowth to improve access for maintenance and management.

Notes

Sources

Former Lynton and Barnstaple Railway stations
Railway stations in Great Britain opened in 1903
Railway stations in Great Britain closed in 1935
Disused railway stations in Devon